Wonderful You may refer to:

 Wonderful You (TV series), a British drama television series
 "Wonderful You" (song), a 1991 song by Rick Astley